Jesús Picó (20 April 1935 – 20 December 1993) was a Chilean footballer. He played in five matches for the Chile national football team in 1957. He was also part of Chile's squad for the 1957 South American Championship.

References

External links
 
 

1935 births
1993 deaths
Chilean footballers
Chile international footballers
Place of birth missing
Association football midfielders
Santiago Wanderers footballers
San Luis de Quillota footballers
Magallanes footballers